In Greek mythology, Agastrophus (Ancient Greek: Ἀγάστροφος) is a Paionian "hero", "famed for his spear", fighting on the side of Troy in the Trojan War, killed by Diomedes. He was the son of Paeon and brother of Laophoon.

Mythology 
Agastrophus' death comes about as the result of a lapse in judgment. Under the influence of Ate, a kind of judgmental blindness, Agastrophus made the fatal mistake of leaving his chariot too far behind him, thus being unable to escape when he was wounded by Diomedes. After killing him Diomedes strips the "gleaming corselet of valiant Agastrophus from about his breast, and the shield from off his shoulder, and his heavy helm".

Notes

References
 Connor, Peter, "Paeon" in Gods, Goddeses, and Mythology, Volume 8, editor, C. Scott Littleton,  Marshall Cavendish, 2005
 Homer. The Iliad with an English Translation by A.T. Murray, Ph.D. in two volumes. Cambridge, MA., Harvard University Press; London, William Heinemann, Ltd. 1924.
 North, Richard, Pagan Words and Christian Meanings, Rodopi, 1991. .
 Parada, Carlos, Genealogical Guide to Greek Mythology, Jonsered, Paul Åströms Förlag, 1993. .
 Quintus Smyrnaeus, The Trojan Epic: Posthomerica, JHU Press, 2007. .
 T. F. E., *"On the Homeric use of the word Ηρως", in The Philological Museum, Volume 2, editor, Julius Charles Hare, Printed by J. Smith for Deightons, 1833.
 Williams, John. "Homerus", in The Edinburgh Review, Volume 77, A. and C. Black, 1843.
 Yamogata, Naoko, Homeric Morality, BRILL, 1994. .
 Yamogata, Naoko, "Disaster revisited: Ate and the Litai in Homer's Iliad" in Personification in the Greek World: From Antiquity to Byzantium Editors, Emma Stafford, Judith Herrin, Ashgate Publishing, Ltd., 2005. .

People of the Trojan War
Paeonian mythology